During the 1939–40 English football season, Brentford competed in the Football League, playing three matches before competitive football was suspended due to the outbreak of the Second World War. The club played in three unofficial wartime competitions for the remainder of the season – groups B and C of the Football League South and the Football League War Cup.

Season summary
After narrowly avoiding relegation towards the end of the 1938–39 season, Brentford manager Harry Curtis allowed full back Joe Wilson and half backs Sam Briddon and Tally Sneddon to transfer away from the club. Curtis signed young Sunderland inside forward Percy Saunders and brought in former Manchester United wing half Tom Mansley as his new captain. The season opened with a heavy 5–1 Football League Jubilee Fund defeat to neighbours Chelsea on 19 August 1939. Brentford began the regular season with a win, a draw and a defeat before competitive football was suspended following Britain's declaration of war on Germany on 3 September 1939. Percy Saunders, who had scored on his debut on the opening day, would become the only pre-war Brentford player to die on active service during the war, when his ship was torpedoed in the Indian Ocean in March 1942.

The cessation of competitive football was worrying for Brentford, with £12,000 having been spent on new players during the off-season (equivalent to £ in ) and there was little prospect of recouping it through the turnstiles. 23 of Brentford's 30-man squad were called to arms, into the War Police Reserve or into the munitions industry. Within two weeks of the declaration of war, the Football League agreed that football could continue, in order to keep clubs in business and to raise funds.

Brentford entered Group B of the new Football League South in October 1939 and the squad was augmented by three guest players who had previously played for the club – Scottish international half back Duncan McKenzie, fellow Scottish half back Archie Scott and inside forward Bert Stephens. 30-year old centre forward Jack Holliday (previously prolific in the Third and Second Divisions between 1932 and 1935) experienced a renaissance, scoring 14 goals in 16 appearances, though Brentford could finish no better than 5th.

A further 18-match campaign followed in Group C in the first six months of 1940, with 13 players guesting, including two former international Brentford players – Scotland's David McCulloch and the United States' Jim Brown. The Bees finished 4th in the 10-team group and exited the Football League War Cup in the first round.

League tables

Football League First Division

Football League South Group B

Football League South Group C

Results
Brentford's goal tally listed first.

Legend

Football League First Division

Football League South Group B

Football League South Group C

Football League War Cup 

 Sources: A-Z Of Bees, Rothmans Book of Football League Records 1888–89 to 1978–79, 100 Years Of Brentford

Playing squad 
 Players' ages are as of the opening day of the 1939–40 season.

 Sources: Timeless Bees, Football League Players' Records 1888 to 1939, 100 Years Of Brentford

Coaching staff

Statistics

Appearances and goals

Players listed in italics left the club mid-season.
Source: 100 Years Of Brentford

Goalscorers 

Players listed in italics left the club mid-season.
Source: 100 Years Of Brentford

Wartime international caps

Management

Summary

Transfers & loans 
Guest players' arrival and departure dates correspond to their first and last appearances of the season.

References 

Brentford F.C. seasons
Brentford